Valle del Zalabí is a municipality located in the province of Granada, Spain. According to (INE), the town has a population of 2,315 inhabitants in 2011.

It is mainly formed by the neighbourhoods of Exfiliana, Alcudia de Guadix and Charches, which were independent municipalities until 1973.

References

Municipalities in the Province of Granada